The 1996–97 NBA season was the 27th season for the Portland Trail Blazers in the National Basketball Association. During the off-season, the Blazers signed free agent Kenny Anderson, acquired Isaiah Rider from the Minnesota Timberwolves, and acquired second-year forward Rasheed Wallace and Mitchell Butler from the Washington Bullets. This season is also notable for the team drafting high school basketball star Jermaine O'Neal with the 17th pick in the 1996 NBA draft. The Blazers would hover around .500 for most of the first half of the season, holding a 25–23 record at the All-Star break. At midseason, the team traded Aaron McKie to the Detroit Pistons in exchange for Stacey Augmon. The Blazers then posted a 13–2 record in March, which included an 11-game winning streak, then won their final four games of the season. The Blazers finished third in the Pacific Division, and fifth in the Western Conference with a 49–33 record. Making their 15th straight trip to the postseason and 20th in 21 years.

Anderson led the team with 17.5 points, 7.1 assists and 2.0 steals per game, while Rider finished second on the team in scoring with 16.1 points per game, and Clifford Robinson contributed 15.1 points per game. In addition, Wallace averaged 15.1 points and 6.8 rebounds per game, but only played 62 games due to a broken thumb, while second-year center Arvydas Sabonis provided the team with 13.4 points and 7.9 rebounds per game. Off the bench, second-year forward Gary Trent provided with 10.8 points and 5.2 rebounds per game, and Chris Dudley contributed 7.3 rebounds and 1.2 blocks per game. Wallace also finished in third place in Most Improved Player voting. The Trail Blazers had the seventh best team defensive rating in the NBA.

The Blazers faced the Los Angeles Lakers in the Western Conference First Round of the NBA Playoffs, and were defeated 1–3, marking the fifth straight year they were eliminated in the first round.

Following the season, head coach P. J. Carlesimo was fired, while Robinson signed as a free agent with the Phoenix Suns after eight seasons in Portland, Dudley was traded to the New York Knicks, and Butler signed with the Cleveland Cavaliers.

Draft picks

Roster

Regular season

Season standings

z - clinched division title
y - clinched division title
x - clinched playoff spot

Record vs. opponents

Game log

Playoffs

| home_wins = 1
| home_losses = 1
| road_wins = 0
| road_losses = 2
}}
|- align="center" bgcolor="#ffcccc"
| 1
| April 25
| @ L.A. Lakers
| L 77–95
| Wallace, Sabonis (18)
| Chris Dudley (11)
| Isaiah Rider (5)
| Great Western Forum17,505
| 0–1
|- align="center" bgcolor="#ffcccc"
| 2
| April 27
| @ L.A. Lakers
| L 93–107
| Rasheed Wallace (20)
| Clifford Robinson (10)
| Kenny Anderson (7)
| Great Western Forum17,505
| 0–2
|- align="center" bgcolor="#ccffcc"
| 3
| April 30
| L.A. Lakers
| W 98–90
| Kenny Anderson (30)
| Chris Dudley (7)
| Kenny Anderson (5)
| Rose Garden21,538
| 1–2
|- align="center" bgcolor="#ffcccc"
| 4
| May 2
| L.A. Lakers
| L 91–95
| Arvydas Sabonis (23)
| Arvydas Sabonis (10)
| Kenny Anderson (5)
| Rose Garden21,538
| 1–3
|-

Player statistics

NOTE: Please write the players statistics in alphabetical order by last name.

Season

Playoffs

Awards and records

Transactions

Trades

Free agents

Player Transactions Citation:

References

Portland Trail Blazers seasons
Portland Trail Blazers 1996
Portland Trail Blazers 1997
Port
Port
Port